Billy Douglas (1912–1978) was an American jazz trumpeter and vocalist.

Douglas played with Larry Ringold while young, both of them having been house in the same boys' institution. He played locally in his teens, and moved to New York City in 1932 as a member of Earle Howard's band. He played with Percy Nelson in Hartford in 1933-34, then played in the South with Jimmy Gunn. Don Albert picked him up in 1934, and Douglas remained in Albert's orchestra through 1937. Douglas did freelance work for a time, then worked with Earl Hines for several years in the early 1940s.

After 1945 he returned to New Haven, Connecticut, where he performed locally until his retirement.

References
Eugene Chadbourne, [ Billy Douglas] at Allmusic

Further reading
Barry Kernfeld. The New Grove Dictionary of Jazz.

1912 births
1978 deaths
American jazz trumpeters
American male trumpeters
20th-century American musicians
20th-century trumpeters
Jazz musicians from Connecticut
20th-century American male musicians
American male jazz musicians